Mika Tapio Vainio (May 15, 1963 – April 12, 2017) was a Finnish electronic musician. He was best known as a member of Pan Sonic. In addition to his real name, he recorded under the aliases Ø, Kentolevi, Philus, and Tekonivel.

He has worked with artists such as Alan Vega, Barry Adamson, Charlemagne Palestine, Alva Noto, Peaches, Kevin Drumm, Björk, Stephen O'Malley, Keiji Haino, Michael Gira, Chicks on Speed, Merzbow, and many others.

Life and career
Mika Vainio was born on May 15, 1963 in Helsinki, but grew up in Turku. In the early 1980s he played in the group Gagarin-Kombinaatti while also working at a slaughterhouse.

In the late 1980s, Vainio began DJing and organizing parties, playing acid house. It was here that he met Tommi Grönlund, who would later found Sähkö Recordings. Sähkö would release much of Vainio's music.

In the mid-1990s, he formed the group Pan Sonic with Ilpo Väisänen and later Sami Salo (who would soon leave). Pan Sonic disbanded in December 2009, playing their final concert on December 18.

Vainio died on April 12, 2017 in Trouville-sur-Mer, France after falling six meters off of a cliff into the sea. The exact circumstances of his death are unknown.

References

External links
 Mika Vainio official site
 Mika Vainio official Facebook
 Mika Vainio fansite on pHinnWeb
 
 
 Mika Vainio remembered by Blast First boss Paul Smith

1963 births
2017 deaths
Ambient musicians
Experimental musicians
Finnish electronic musicians
Finnish techno musicians
Musicians from Turku
Accidental deaths from falls
Accidental deaths in France